Eisegesis is the process of interpreting text in such a way as to introduce one's own presuppositions, agendas or biases. It is commonly referred to as reading into the text. It is often done to "prove" a pre-held point of concern, and to provide confirmation bias corresponding with the pre-held interpretation and any agendas supported by it. 

Eisegesis is best understood when contrasted with exegesis. Exegesis is drawing out a text's meaning in accordance with the author's context and discoverable meaning. Eisegesis is when a reader imposes their interpretation of the text. Thus exegesis tends to be objective; and eisegesis, highly subjective.

The plural of eisegesis is eisegeses. Someone who practices eisegesis is known as an eisegete; this is also the verb form. "Eisegete" is often used in a mildly derogatory way.

Although the terms eisegesis and exegesis are commonly heard in association with Biblical interpretation, both (especially exegesis) are broadly used across literary disciplines.

In Biblical study
While exegesis is an attempt to determine the historical context within which a particular verse exists—the so-called "Sitz im Leben" or life setting—eisegetes often neglect this aspect of Biblical study.

In the field of Biblical exegesis, scholars take great care to avoid eisegesis. In this field, eisegesis is regarded as "poor exegesis".

In the field of biblical proof texts, Christian theologians and missionaries are often accused of practicing eisegesis using isolated, out-of-context quotations from the Christian Bible to establish a proposition or to read Christ into the Hebrew Bible.

While some denominations and scholars denounce Biblical eisegesis, many Christians are known to employ it—albeit inadvertently—as part of their own experiential theology. Modern evangelical scholars accuse liberal Protestants of practicing Biblical eisegesis, while mainline scholars accuse fundamentalists of practicing eisegesis. Roman Catholics and Orthodox Christians say that all Protestants engage in eisegesis, because the Bible can be correctly understood only through the lens of Holy Tradition as handed down by the institutional Church; this is articulated in the Dei verbum. Protestants and fundamentalist Christians likewise often accuse Roman Catholics and Orthodox Christians of eisegesis for viewing Scripture through Holy Tradition, and may accuse Roman Catholics and Orthodox Christians of fabricating or distorting tradition to support their view, which they see as opposed to the doctrine of Sola scriptura where the text is believed to be able to speak for itself without Holy Tradition. Jews, in turn, might assert that Christians practice eisegesis when they read the Old Testament as anticipating Jesus of Nazareth.

Exactly what constitutes Biblical eisegesis remains a source of debate among theologians, but most scholars agree about the importance of determining the authorial intentions. Determining the author's intent can often be difficult, especially for books which were written anonymously.

In Bible translation 
In conducting Bible translation, translators have to make many exegetical decisions. Sometimes the decisions made by translators are criticized by those who disagree, and who characterize the work of the translators as involving "eisegesis". Some translators make their doctrinal distinctives clear in a preface, such as Stephen Reynolds in his Purified Translation of the Bible, where he explained his belief that Christians should never drink alcohol, and translated accordingly. Such translators may be accused by some of eisegesis, but they have made their positions clear.

See also

Biblical literalism
Cafeteria Christianity
Cherry picking
Quoting out of context

References

Further reading
 Exegesis, Biblical Erwin Fahlbusch and Geoffrey William Bromiley, The Encyclopedia of Christianity (Grand Rapids, Mich.; Leiden, Netherlands: Wm. B. Eerdmans; Brill, 1999-2003). 2:237.

External links 

 

Biblical exegesis
Hermeneutics